Reuben D. Gaither (1831-1919) was a state legislator in South Carolina. He represented Kershaw County in the South Carolina House of Representatives 1870-1877.

He was a Baptist minister and farm tenant according to the 1870 United States census.

See also
African-American officeholders during and following the Reconstruction era

References

Members of the South Carolina House of Representatives
1831 births
1919 deaths